Safety is the state of being "safe", the condition of being protected from harm or other danger. Safety can also refer to the control of recognized hazards in order to achieve an acceptable level of risk.

Meanings

There are two slightly different meanings of safety. For example, home safety may indicate a building's ability to protect against external harm events (such as weather, home invasion, etc.), or may indicate that its internal installations (such as appliances, stairs, etc.) are safe (not dangerous or harmful) for its inhabitants.

Discussions of safety often include mention of related terms. Security is such a term. With time the definitions between these two have often become interchanged, equated, and frequently appear juxtaposed in the same sentence. Readers unfortunately are left to conclude whether they comprise a redundancy. This confuses the uniqueness that should be reserved for each by itself. When seen as unique, as we intend here, each term will assume its rightful place in influencing and being influenced by the other.

Safety is the condition of a “steady state” of an organization or place doing what it is supposed to do. “What it is supposed to do” is defined in terms of public codes and standards, associated architectural and engineering designs, corporate vision and mission statements, and operational plans and personnel policies. For any organization, place, or function, large or small, safety is a normative concept. It complies with situation-specific definitions of what is expected and acceptable.

Using this definition, protection from a home's external threats and protection from its internal structural and equipment failures (see Meanings, above) are not two types of safety but rather two aspects of a home's steady state.

In the world of everyday affairs, not all goes as planned. Some entity's steady state is challenged. This is where security science, which is of more recent date, enters.  Drawing from the definition of safety, then:

Security is the process or means, physical or human, of delaying, preventing, and otherwise protecting against external or internal, defects, dangers, loss, criminals, and other individuals or actions that threaten, hinder or destroy an organization’s “steady state,” and deprive it of its intended purpose for being.

Using this generic definition of safety it is possible to specify the elements of a security program.

Limitations
Safety can be limited in relation to some guarantee or a standard of insurance to the quality and unharmful function of an object or organization. It is used in order to ensure that the object or organization will do only what it is meant to do.

It is important to realize that safety is relative. Eliminating all risk, if even possible, would be extremely difficult and very expensive. A safe situation is one where risks of injury or property damage are low and manageable.

When something is called safe, this usually means that it is safe within certain reasonable limits and parameters.  For example, a medication may be safe, for most people, under most circumstances, if taken in a certain amount.

A choice motivated by safety may have other, unsafe consequences.  For example, frail elderly people are sometimes moved out of their homes and into hospitals or skilled nursing homes with the claim that this will improve the person's safety.  The safety provided is that daily medications will be supervised, the person will not need to engage in some potentially risky activities such as climbing stairs or cooking, and if the person falls down, someone there will be able to help the person get back up.  However, the end result might be decidedly unsafe, including the dangers of transfer trauma, hospital delirium, elder abuse, hospital-acquired infections, depression, anxiety, and even a desire to die.

Types
There is a distinction between products that meet standards, that are safe, and that merely feel safe. The highway safety community uses these terms:

Normative

Normative safety is achieved when a product or design meets applicable standards and practices for design and construction or manufacture, regardless of the product's actual safety history.

Substantive
Substantive or objective safety occurs when the real-world safety history is favorable, whether or not standards are met.

Perceived
Perceived or subjective safety refers to the users' level of comfort and perception of risk, without consideration of standards or safety history. For example, traffic signals are perceived as safe, yet under some circumstances, they can increase traffic crashes at an intersection. Traffic roundabouts have a generally favorable safety record yet often make drivers nervous.

Low perceived safety can have costs. For example, after the 9/11 attacks in 2001, many people chose to drive rather than fly, despite the fact that, even counting terrorist attacks, flying is safer than driving. Perceived risk discourages people from  walking and bicycling for transportation, enjoyment or exercise, even though the health benefits outweigh the risk of injury.

Security
Also called social safety or public safety, security addresses the risk of harm due to intentional criminal acts such as assault, burglary or vandalism.

Because of the moral issues involved, security is of higher importance to many people than substantive safety. For example, a death due to murder is considered worse than a death in a car crash, even though in many countries, traffic deaths are more common than homicides.

Risks and responses 
Safety is generally interpreted as implying a real and significant impact on risk of death, injury or damage to property.  In response to perceived risks many interventions may be proposed with engineering responses and regulation being two of the most common.

Probably the most common individual response to perceived safety issues is insurance, which compensates for or provides restitution in the case of damage or loss.

System safety and reliability engineering 
System safety and reliability engineering is an engineering discipline. Continuous changes in technology, environmental regulation and public safety concerns make the analysis of complex safety-critical systems more and more demanding.

A common fallacy, for example among electrical engineers regarding structure power systems, is that safety issues can be readily deduced. In fact, safety issues have been discovered one by one, over more than a century in the case mentioned, in the work of many thousands of practitioners, and cannot be deduced by a single individual over a few decades. A knowledge of the literature, the standards and custom in a field is a critical part of safety engineering. A combination of theory and track record of practices is involved, and track record indicates some of the areas of theory that are relevant. (In the US, persons with a state license in Professional Engineering in Electrical Engineering are expected to be competent in this regard, the foregoing notwithstanding, but most electrical engineers have no need of the license for their work.)

Safety is often seen as one of a group of related disciplines: quality, reliability, availability, maintainability and safety. (Availability is sometimes not mentioned, on the principle that it is a simple function of reliability and maintainability.) These issues tend to determine the value of any work, and deficits in any of these areas are considered to result in a cost, beyond the cost of addressing the area in the first place; good management is then expected to minimize total cost.

Measures 
Safety measures are activities and precautions taken to improve safety, i.e. reduce risk related to human health. Common safety measures include:
 Chemical analysis
 Destructive testing of samples
 Drug testing of employees, etc.
 Examination of activities by specialists to minimize physical stress or increase productivity
 Geological surveys to determine whether land or water sources are polluted, how firm the ground is at a potential building site, etc.
 Government regulation so suppliers know what standards their product is expected to meet.
 Industry regulation so suppliers know what level of quality is expected. Industry regulation is often imposed to avoid potential government regulation.
 Instruction manuals explaining how to use a product or perform an activity
 Instructional videos demonstrating proper use of products
 Root cause analysis to identify causes of a system failure and correct deficiencies.
 Internet safety  or Online Safety, is protection of the user's safety from cyber threats or computer crime in general.
 Periodic evaluations of employees, departments, etc.
 Physical examinations to determine whether a person has a physical condition that would create a problem.
 Process safety management is an analytical tool focused on preventing releases of highly hazardous chemicals.
 Safety margins/Safety factors. For instance, a product rated to never be required to handle more than 200 pounds might be designed to fail under at least 400 pounds, a safety factor of two. Higher numbers are used in more sensitive applications such as medical or transit safety.
 Self-imposed regulation of various types.
 Implementation of standard protocols and procedures so that activities are conducted in a known way.
 Statements of ethics by industry organizations or an individual company so its employees know what is expected of them.
 Stress testing subjects a person or product to stresses in excess of those the person or product is designed to handle, to determining the "breaking point".
 Training of employees, vendors, product users
 Visual examination for dangerous situations such as emergency exits blocked because they are being used as storage areas.
 Visual examination for flaws such as cracks, peeling, loose connections.
 X-ray analysis to see inside a sealed object such as a weld, a cement wall or an airplane outer skin.

Standards organizations 
A number of standards organizations exist that promulgate safety standards. These may be voluntary organizations or government agencies. These agencies first define the safety standards, which they publish in the form of codes. They are also Accreditation Bodies and entitle independent third parties such as testing and certification agencies to inspect and ensure compliance to the standards they defined. For instance, the American Society of Mechanical Engineers (ASME) formulated a certain number of safety standards in its Boiler and Pressure Vessel Code (BPVC) and accredited TÜV Rheinland to provide certification services to guarantee product compliance to the defined safety regulations.

United States

American National Standards Institute 
A major American standards organization is the American National Standards Institute (ANSI). Usually, members of a particular industry will voluntarily form a committee to study safety issues and propose standards. Those standards are then recommended to ANSI, which reviews and adopts them. Many government regulations require that products sold or used must comply with a particular ANSI standard.

Government agencies 
Many government agencies set safety standards for matters under their jurisdiction, such as:
 the Food and Drug Administration
 the Consumer Product Safety Commission
 the United States Environmental Protection Agency

Testing laboratories 
Product safety testing, for the United States, is largely controlled by the Consumer Product Safety Commission. In addition, workplace related products come under the jurisdiction of the Occupational Safety and Health Administration (OSHA), which certifies independent testing companies as Nationally Recognized Testing Laboratories (NRTL), see.

European Union

Institutions
 the European Commission (EC)
 the European Committee for Standardization (CEN)
 the European Food Safety Authority (EFSA)
 the European Safety Federation (ESF)

Testing laboratories
The European Commission provides the legal framework, but the different Member States may authorize test laboratories to carry out safety testing.

Other countries

Standards institutions
 British Standards Institution
 Canadian Standards Association
 Deutsches Institut für Normung
 International Organization for Standardization
 Standards Australia

Testing laboratories
Many countries have national organizations that have accreditation to test and/or submit test reports for safety certification. These are typically referred to as a Notified or Competent Body.

See also 

 
 
 
 
 
 
 
 
 
 
 
 
 
 
 
 
  CDC
 
 
 
 
 
 
 
 
 
 
 
 
 
 
 
 
 
 
 
 
 
 
 
 
 
 
 
  safety

References

Further reading